Peterson Silvino Da Cruz (born 24 April 1993), commonly known as Peu, is a Brazilian footballer who plays as a forward for Desportivo Aves.

References

External links

1993 births
Living people
Brazilian footballers
Association football forwards
Campeonato Brasileiro Série A players
Avaí FC players
Clube Atlético Metropolitano players
Fluminense FC players
Liga MX players
Santos Laguna footballers
FC ŠTK 1914 Šamorín players
2. Liga (Slovakia) players
C.D. Aves players
Paysandu Sport Club players
Brazilian expatriate footballers
Brazilian expatriate sportspeople in Poland
Brazilian expatriate sportspeople in Mexico
Brazilian expatriate sportspeople in Slovakia
Brazilian expatriate sportspeople in Portugal
Expatriate footballers in Poland
Expatriate footballers in Mexico
Expatriate footballers in Slovakia
Expatriate footballers in Portugal